Bhavana Radhakrishnan (born 28 July 1961) is a Carnatic singer and playback singer in Malayalam cinema. She received the 1997  Kerala State Film Award for Best Singer for the song "Ennodenthini pinakkam" in the film Kaliyattam.

She was awarded a doctorate in music by the University Of Kerala. She is a music educator and currently working as associate professor  in Carnatic music at SN College, Kollam. She is also known as a performer of devotional music.

Filmography
The songs that she sang in films are :-

References

External links
 

1961 births
Living people
Indian women playback singers
Malayalam playback singers
People from Palakkad district
Sree Narayana College, Kollam
Academic staff of the University of Kerala
Indian women musicologists
Indian musicologists
Women Carnatic singers
Carnatic singers
Kerala State Film Award winners
Indian women classical singers
Performers of Hindu music
Singers from Kerala
Women music educators
Film musicians from Kerala
20th-century Indian singers
Educators from Kerala
20th-century Indian educators
Women musicians from Kerala
21st-century Indian singers
21st-century Indian women singers
20th-century Indian women singers
Women educators from Kerala
20th-century women educators